During 2004, the Australian radio station ABC Classic FM held a Classic 100 Piano countdown.

The works in the countdown were selected by votes cast by almost 10,000 listeners to the station.

The broadcasting of the results of the countdown began on 10 February 2005 and concluded on 12 February 2005.

Survey summary 
The results of the countdown are as follows:

By composer
The following 29 composers were featured in the countdown:

See also 
Classic 100 Countdowns

References

External links

Classic 100 Countdowns (ABC)
2004 in Australian music
2004 in radio